Luciobarbus magniatlantis is a doubtfully distinct, ray-finned fish species in the family Cyprinidae. It is native to the Atlas Mountains of Morocco.

Its natural habitat is freshwater springs. It is considered a threatened species by the IUCN.

The taxonomy and systematics of the Maghreb barbs are subject to considerable dispute. Some authors consider L. magniatlantis a distinct species, while others include it in L. nasus.

References

 

Luciobarbus
Cyprinid fish of Africa
Endemic fauna of Morocco
Freshwater fish of North Africa
Taxa named by Jacques Pellegrin
Fish described in 1919
Taxonomy articles created by Polbot